Eldridge Glacier is a major glacier in Denali National Park and Preserve in the U.S. state of Alaska. A large unnamed tributary glacier joins Eldridge Glacier a few miles above its terminus.

See also
 List of glaciers

References

Glaciers of Matanuska-Susitna Borough, Alaska
Glaciers of Denali National Park and Preserve
Glaciers of Alaska